Israel Benjamin "Bo" Curtis (September 11, 1932 – February 16, 2012) was an American politician. He served as a Democratic member for the 26th district of the Louisiana House of Representatives.

Life and career
Curtis attended Peabody Magnet High School and went on to Grambling State University, where he earned his Bachelor of Science degree. Curtis earned his master's degree at Northwestern State University. He then attended  Texas Christian University and Texas Southern University, as well as Michigan State University.

Curtis served in the United States Army during the Korean War, and was later a member of the Veterans of Foreign Wars.

Curtis served as a member of the Rapides Parish School Board. After moving to Alexandria, Louisiana, he was a bodyguard for Baptist minister and activist Martin Luther King Jr, and the funeral director for the Winnfield Life Insurance Company.

In 1992, Curtis was elected to represent the 26th district of the Louisiana House of Representatives, succeeding Charles R. Herring. He was succeeded by Herbert Dixon in 2008.

Curtis died in February 2012, at the age of 79. He was buried in Alexandria Memorial Gardens.

References 

1932 births
2012 deaths
Democratic Party members of the Louisiana House of Representatives
20th-century American politicians
21st-century American politicians
School board members in Louisiana
Politicians from Alexandria, Louisiana
Activists for African-American civil rights
African-American state legislators in Louisiana
Educators from Louisiana
Insurance agents
Peabody Magnet High School alumni
Grambling State University alumni
Northwestern State University alumni
Texas Southern University alumni
Texas Christian University alumni
Michigan State University alumni
Baptists from Louisiana
United States Army soldiers
United States Army personnel of the Korean War
American funeral directors
Burials in Louisiana
African-American school board members
20th-century Baptists
20th-century African-American politicians
African-American men in politics
21st-century African-American politicians